Danny Shirley (born August 12, 1956) is an American country music singer and songwriter. He is best known as the lead singer of the country rock band Confederate Railroad, a role he has held since its formation in 1987.

Before the band was founded, Shirley recorded for Amor Records and charted five singles of his own.

In 1994, Shirley co-wrote and sang guest vocals (along with Mark Collie) on "Redneck Heaven", a track from Billy Ray Cyrus's Storm in the Heartland album.

Shirley is a 1974 graduate of Hixson High School in the Chattanooga suburb of Hixson.

Discography

Singles

References

1956 births
American male singer-songwriters
American country singer-songwriters
Living people
People from Chattanooga, Tennessee
Country musicians from Tennessee
Singer-songwriters from Tennessee